Stephen Edward Brennan (born 2 November 1951) is an English professional darts player who competed in the 1980s. He was a civil engineer from Leiston and began playing county darts for Suffolk in 1979–1980. He was eligible to play for Northern Ireland because his father Patrick "Pat" Brennan was born in Derry.

Darts career 
He made his Embassy World Darts Championship debut in 1982 and caused one of the great upsets in darts history by beating defending champion Eric Bristow in the first round. He also knocked out Dave Whitcombe in the second round before losing 0–4 to Stefan Lord in the quarter-finals.

He appeared at the next four World Championships, but only won two more matches – both first round victories in 1984 and 1985. His last appearance came in 1986 when he lost in the first round to Paul Lim.

After another surprise victory over Bristow in the 1986 MFI World Matchplay tournament, The Crafty Cockney famously declared that "he kept losing to wallies."

Steve has 3 brothers, (Nigel, Kevin and Trevor) and 1 sister, (Teresa).

World Championship results

BDO 
 1982: Quarter Finals: (lost to Stefan Lord 0–4) (sets)
 1983: Last 32: (lost to Jocky Wilson 0–2)
 1984: Last 16: (lost to Dave Whitcombe 1–4)
 1985: Last 16: (lost to Alan Glazier 2–3)
 1986: Last 32: (lost to Paul Lim 1–3)

References

External links 
Profile and stats on Darts Database

1951 births
Living people
Darts players from Northern Ireland
British Darts Organisation players
People from Leiston
Sportspeople from Derry (city)